The Zilker Botanical Garden (31 acres; 125,000 m²) is a botanical garden of varied topography located on the south bank of the Colorado River at 2220 Barton Springs Road, near downtown Austin, Texas, United States.

Theme gardens include the Taniguchi Japanese Garden, The Riparian Streambed, The Hartman Prehistoric Garden, and The Mabel Davis Rose Garden.

The Botanical Garden was established as a non-profit organization in 1955, and is the centerpiece of Zilker Park. It features several independently maintained gardens, each of a particular focus:

City of Austin's Green Garden
Cactus and Succulent Garden
Hartman Prehistoric Garden
Herb and Fragrance Garden
Isamu Taniguchi Oriental Garden
Mabel Davis Rose Garden
Doug Blachly Butterfly Trail and Garden
Pioneer Village

Gallery

See also
 List of botanical gardens in the United States

References

External links

Botanical gardens in Texas
Culture of Austin, Texas
Geography of Austin, Texas
Tourist attractions in Austin, Texas
Protected areas of Travis County, Texas
Japanese gardens in the United States